Barchaleh may refer to:
 Barchaleh, Lorestan